Ride It is the title of several works. It may refer to:
"Ride It" (Geri Halliwell song)
"Ride It" (Jay Sean song)